The siege of Namwon was a military engagement that occurred from 23 September to 26 September 1597. It ended in Japanese victory.

Background
Ukita Hideie marched on Namweon with around 49,600 soldiers on 11 September 1597. They arrived on 23 September.

Namweon was garrisoned by 3,000 Ming soldiers and 1,000 Koreans under Yang Yuan and I Boknam.

Battle
The Japanese began by sending 100 soldiers to test the fort's defenses.

On 24 September, the Japanese filled the trench with straw and earth. Then they took shelter in the burned out houses in the city.

On 25 September, the Japanese asked the defenders to surrender, but they refused.

On the night of 26 September, the Japanese bombarded Namweon for two hours while their men climbed the walls and used fresh straw to create a ramp to the top. Unable to burn the moist rice stalks, the defenders were helpless against the Japanese onslaught and the fortress fell.

Aftermath
Yang Yuan managed to break the Japanese encirclement and escape with 100 men. He reached Jeonju only to find it deserted. The Ming commander assigned to the city's defense, Chen Youyuan, not only ignored the call for help Yang had sent him, but fled the moment news of Namweon's fall arrived. Yang continued to Hanseong and arrived the following week.

Citations

Bibliography

 
 
 
 
 
 
 
 
 
 
 桑田忠親 [Kuwata, Tadachika], ed., 舊參謀本部編纂, [Kyu Sanbo Honbu], 朝鮮の役 [Chousen no Eki]　(日本の戰史 [Nihon no Senshi] Vol. 5), 1965.

External links

The Siege of Namwon (in Korean)
Beyond Turtleboats: Siege Accounts From Hideyoshi’s Second Invasion of Korea, 1597-1598 - The Siege of Namwon

Namwon
1597 in Korea
Namwon
Namwon